Ferencvárosi Torna Club founded in 1899, is a major Hungarian multi-sport club based in Ferencváros district of Budapest, Hungary. The well-supported men's football team is the most popular team in the country. The parent multisport club Ferencvárosi TC divisions include women's football, women's handball, men's futsal, men's ice hockey, men's handball, men's water polo, cycling, gymnastics, athletics, wrestling, curling and swimming teams, some of which are highly successful.

Departments

Team sports
 Football:
 men's football (since 1899)
 women's football (since 2004)
 Handball:
 men's handball (since 1950)
 women's handball (since 1950)
 Water polo:
 men's water polo (since 1904)
 women's water polo
 Ice hockey:
 men's ice hockey (since 1928)
 women's ice hockey
 Nine-pin bowling (since 1948)
 Curling (since 2008)
 Synchronized swimming (since 2015)

Individual sports
 Athletics (since 1903)
 Boxing (since 1910)
 Canoing (since 1955)
 Cycling (since 1910)
 Gymnastics (since 1904)
 Fencing (1904–1915, 1922–1945, since 2017)
 Swimming (since 1904)
 Skating (since 2019)
 Triathlon (since 2015)
 Wrestling (since 1912)

Dissolved departments
 Basketball
 women's basketball (1993–2000, 2010–2012)

Sport facilities 

The football team plays in Groupama Aréna in Ferencváros, Budapest. The handball teams play in the Elek Gyula Aréna. The boxing, cycling, fencing and wrestling departments play in the FTC-MVM Népligeti Sportközpont. 
The ice hockey team play in the Tüskecsarnok, the water polo team play at Komjádi Béla Sportuszoda, the women's football team play at Kocsis Sándor Sportközpont, the short track speed skating department play at Gyakorló Jégcsarnok, the curling team play at Kamaraerdei Curling Club, the canoeing department using facilities at ELTE Vízisporttelep.

Supporters and rivalries

Supporters
Supporters of Ferencváros are mainly from the capital city of Hungary, Budapest. However, the club is popular all over Hungary.

Notable supporters

 László Aradszky, singer
 Fecó Balázs, singer and songwriter
 Imre Bajor, actor
 Zsolt Baumgartner, racing driver
 Gyula Bodrogi, actor
 István Bujtor, actor, director, producer and screenplay writer
 Zsuzsa Csala, actress
 Károly Eperjes, actor
 Bertalan Farkas, cosmonaut
 Tivadar Farkasházy, humorist, author, and journalist
 Károly Frenreisz, singer and songwriter
 Gyula Grosics, footballer
 László Helyey, actor
 Ferenc Karinthy, novelist, playwright, journalist, editor and translator
 Zoltán Kocsis, pianist, conductor and composer
 László Komár, singer
 János Koós, singer
 István Kovács, boxer
 Kati Kovács, singer, performer, lyricist and actress
 András Kozák, actor
 Peter Leko, chess player
 Péter Máté, singer, composer, and pianist
 Erika Miklósa, coloratura soprano
 Zoltán Mucsi, actor
 Feró Nagy, singer and musician
 Gyula Ortutay, ethnographer and politician
 András Rédli, fencer
 Imre Sinkovits, actor
 Gyula Szabó, actor
 István Tarlós, politician
 Gábor Wéber, racing driver and commentator

Friendships
The fans have friendships with fans of Rapid Wien and Panathinaikos, and as all three play in Green the alliance is nicknamed the "Green Brothers". They also have friendly relations in Hungary with fans of Zalaegerszeg and in Poland with Śląsk Wrocław and Bałtyk Gdynia.

Rivalries

Ferencváros have rivalry with several teams from Budapest including MTK Budapest, Újpest, Honvéd, Vasas SC, and several provincial clubs such as Debrecen and Diósgyőr.

The biggest rivalry is with Újpest, which dates back to the 1930s when Újpest won their first Hungarian Football League title. Since then, the fixture between the two teams attracts the most spectators in the domestic league. The matches between the two teams often end in violence which causes big trouble for the Hungarian football. The proposal of personal registration was refused by both clubs.

The fixture between Ferencváros and MTK Budapest FC is called the Örökrangadó or Eternal derby. It is the oldest football rivalry in Hungary, which dates back as early as the 1903 football season when Ferencváros first won the Hungarian League. In the following three decades either Ferencváros or MTK Budapest won the domestic league.

Bp. Honvéd are also considered fierce rivals as the clubs are in very close proximity to each other and in the past frequently competed for honours.

Honours

Active departments

Football (men's)

Hungarian Championship
Winners (33) (record): 1903, 1905, 1906–07, 1908–09, 1909–10, 1910–11, 1911–12, 1912–13, 1925–26, 1926–27, 1927–28, 1931–32, 1933–34, 1937–38, 1939–40, 1940–41, 1948–49, 1962–63, 1964, 1967, 1968, 1975–76, 1980–81, 1991–92, 1994–95, 1995–96, 2000–01, 2003–04, 2015–16, 2018–19, 2019–20, 2020–21, 2021–22
Hungarian Second League
 Winners (1): 2008–09
Hungarian Cup
 Winners (24) (record): 1912–13, 1921–22, 1926–27, 1927–28, 1932–33, 1934–35, 1941–42, 1942–43, 1943–44, 1955–58, 1971–72, 1973–74, 1975–76, 1977–78, 1990–91, 1992–93, 1993–94, 1994–95, 2002–03, 2003–04, 2014–15, 2015–16, 2016–17, 2021–22
Hungarian Super Cup (defunct)
Winners (6) (record): 1993, 1994, 1995, 2004, 2015, 2016
Hungarian League Cup (defunct)
 Winners (2): 2012–13, 2014–15

Inter-Cities Fairs Cup (defunct, predecessor of UEFA Cup)
 Winners (1): 1964–65
Mitropa Cup (defunct)
Winners (2): 1928, 1937
Challenge Cup (defunct)
Winners (1): 1908–09

Water polo (men's)

Hungarian Championship
Winners (24): 1910, 1911, 1912, 1913, 1918, 1919, 1920, 1921, 1922, 1925, 1926, 1927, 1944, 1956, 1962, 1963, 1965, 1968, 1987–88, 1989–90, 1999–00, 2017–18, 2018–19, 2021–22
Hungarian Cup
 Winners (22) (record): 1923, 1924, 1926, 1949, 1957, 1962, 1964, 1965, 1967, 1969, 1973, 1976, 1977, 1978, 1988–89, 1989–90, 1996, 2018, 2019, 2020, 2021, 2022

LEN Champions League
 Winners (1): 2018–19
LEN Cup Winners' Cup (defunct)
Winners (4) (record): 1974–75, 1977–78, 1979–80, 1997–98
LEN Super Cup
Winners (4): 1978, 1980, 2018, 2019

Ice hockey (men's)

Hungarian Championship:
Winners (29) (record): 1950–51, 1954–55, 1955–56, 1960–61, 1961–62, 1963–64, 1966–67, 1970–71, 1971–72, 1972–73, 1973–74, 1974–75, 1975–76, 1976–77, 1977–78, 1978–79, 1979–80, 1983–84, 1988–89, 1990–91, 1991–92, 1992–93, 1993–94, 1994–95, 1996–97, 2018–19, 2019–20, 2020–21, 2021–22
Hungarian Cup:
Winners (15) (record): 1967–68, 1968–69, 1972–73, 1973–74, 1974–75, 1975–76, 1976–77, 1978–79, 1979–80, 1982–83, 1989–90, 1990–91, 1991–92, 1994–95, 2019–20
Panonian League:
Winners (1): 2002–03
Erste Liga:
Winners (2): 2018–19, 2019–20

Handball (women's)

Hungarian Championship
Winners (13): 1966, 1968, 1969, 1971, 1993–94, 1994–95, 1995–96, 1996–97, 1999–00, 2001–02, 2006–07, 2014–15, 2020–21
Hungarian Cup
 Winners (13): 1967, 1970, 1972, 1977, 1992–93, 1993–94, 1994–95, 1995–96, 1996–97, 2000–01, 2002–03, 2016–17, 2021–22

EHF Cup Winners' Cup (defunct)
Winners (3) (record): 1977–78, 2010–11, 2011–12
EHF Cup
Winner (1): 2005–06

Football (women's)

Hungarian Championship
Winners (5): 2014–15, 2015–16, 2018–19, 2020–21, 2021–22
Hungarian Cup
Winners (6) (record): 2015, 2016, 2017, 2018, 2019, 2021

Handball (men's)

Hungarian Second League
Winners (3): 1970, 2008–09, 2016–17
Hungarian Cup
 Winner (1): 1963

Inactive departments

Basketball (women's)

Hungarian Championship
Winner (1): 1996–97
Hungarian Cup
Winner (1): 1995–96

International honours

Notable former players

Olympic champions
A Ferencvárosi Torna Club olimpiai bajnokainak listája

 Antal Kocsis, boxing
 István Molnár, water polo
 Jenő Dalnoki, football
 Dezső Fábián, water polo
 György Kárpáti, water polo
 Éva Novák, swimming
 Ilona Novák, swimming
 Miklós Szilvási, wrestling (Greco-Roman)
 Károly Szittya, water polo
 Katalin Szőke, swimming
 Miklós Ambrus, water polo
 László Felkai, water polo
 Dezső Gyarmati, water polo
 Dezső Novák, football
 Zoltán Varga, football
 Mihály Hesz, canoe sprint
 István Juhász, football
 Miklós Páncsics, football
 Lajos Szűcs, football
 Zoltán Magyar, gymnastics
 György Gerendás, water polo
 András Sike, wrestling (Greco-Roman)
  Teslim Fatusi, football
 Zoltán Kósz, water polo
 Bulcsú Székely, water polo
 Danuta Kozák, canoe sprint
 Shaoang Liu, short track speed skating

Presidents 
List of the presidents of the Ferencvárosi TC:

 1899–1920: Ferenc Springer
 1920–1923: Aladár Mattyók
 1923–1931: Ernő Gschwindt
 1931–1944: Béla Mailinger (executive president)
 1937–1944: Béla Usetty
 1944: Andor Jaross
 1945–1950: Adolf Nádas (executive president)
 1948–1950: Ferenc Münnich
 1950–1951: Árpád Nöhrer
 1951–1952: István Száraz
 1953–1955: Béla Komoretto
 1956–1958: Károly Weidemann
 1958–1962: János Bédi
 1962–1965: Aladár Végh
 1966–1971: István Kalmár
 1971–1981: János Harót (executive president)
 1971–1980: Lajos Lénárt 
 1980–1985: Tibor Losonci (executive president)
 1981–1988: Imre Kovács
 1985–1990: Károly Hargitai (executive president)
 1988–1989: Ferenc Szabó
 1989–1990: István Debreczeny
 1990–1994: Lajos Harza
 1991–1998: István Szívós (executive president)
 1994–1997: Péter Szerdahelyi
 1997–1998: Benedek Fülöp
 1998–2001: József Torgyán
 1999: Máté Fenyvesi (executive president)
 2001–2006: János Furulyás
 2006: Miklós Inácsy
 2006–2007: Zsolt Dámosy
 2007–2010: György Rieb
 2010–2011: Miklós Kovács
 since 2011: Gábor Kubatov

References

External links 

 Official website 

Multi-sport clubs in Hungary
Sport in Budapest
Sports clubs established in 1899
1899 establishments in Hungary